Budrinskaya-1 is a rural locality (a village) in Verkhovskoye Rural Settlement, Tarnogsky District, Vologda Oblast, Russia. The population was 6 as of 2002.

Geography 
Budrinskaya-1 is located 39 km west of Tarnogsky Gorodok (the district's administrative centre) by road. Kuzminskaya is the nearest rural locality.

References 

Rural localities in Tarnogsky District